Eyster is a given name and surname. Notable persons with that name include:

Surname:
 Christian S. Eyster (1814–1886), associate justice of the Colorado Territorial Supreme Court
 Jeffrey Eyster (born 1970), American architect
 Kevin Eyster, American poker player
 Nellie Blessing Eyster (1836–1922), American journalist, writer, lecturer, and social reformer
 Trevor Eyster, American actor

First/middle name:
 Henry Eyster Jacobs (1844–1932), American educator and theologian